In Spain, a president of an Autonomous Community serves as the chief executive officer in each of the seventeen Autonomous communities and in the two Autonomous cities, where they receive the name of "Mayor-Presidents". As such, regional presidents are responsible for implementing regional laws and overseeing the operation of the state executive branch. As regional leaders, governors advance and pursue new and revised policies and programs using a variety of tools, among them executive laws, executive budgets, and legislative proposals.

The figure of a vice-president is not regulated, and as such, each regional president can decide whether to appoint them or not.

Role and powers 
Autonomous communities in Spain have their own set of devolved powers; typically those communities with stronger local nationalism have more powers, and this type of devolution has been called asymmetrical. Some scholars have referred to the resulting system as a federal system in all but name, or a "federation without federalism". Spain is not a federation, but a decentralized unitary state. While sovereignty is vested in the nation as a whole, represented in the central institutions of government, the nation has, in variable degrees, devolved power to the communities, which, in turn, exercise their right to self-government within the limits set forth in the constitution and their autonomous statutes.

Each Autonomous community has its own Statute of Autonomy, and government, consisting of three branches: executive, legislative, and judicial.

The president heads the government's executive branch in each Autonomous community or city and has control over government budgeting and a role in legislation. Spanish regional presidents do not have term limits and as such, they can serve indefinitely.

All regional presidents are indirectly elected, as it is the role of the regional parliaments to appoint them following regional elections, if they can command a majority.

Presidents of Andalusia, the Basque Country, Catalonia and Galicia, whose Statutes of Autonomy and election laws were created by a special fast procedure, can also select the actual election date and trigger snap elections, and have frequently done so, particularly in the Basque Country and Catalonia. The Andalusian elections are usually set to coincide with the Spanish general elections, but again, there is no requisite to that effect in the Andalusian legislation. In the rest of Autonomies, elections are fixed to a certain common date, which is currently "the fourth Sunday of May each four years".

History

Demographics

Party 

There are currently 9 Autonomous communities with a Socialist president, 6 with a People's Party president, 3 with regionalist or nationalist presidents and 1 with an independent president.

Tenure 
For each term, presidents serve four years in office. All members of regional parliaments are elected for four-year terms, but the president of the community has the faculty to dissolve the legislature and call for early elections. Nonetheless, in all communities except for the Basque Country, Catalonia, Galicia, and Andalusia elections are held the last Sunday of May every four years, concurrent with municipal elections in all Spain.

The longest-serving current president is Miguel Ángel Revilla of Cantabria, who served as president from 2003 to 2011 and again since 2015. The longest-serving continuously president is Iñigo Urkullu from the Basque Country, serving since December 2012.

The longest-serving regional president of all time was Juan Carlos Rodríguez Ibarra of Extremadura, who was elected in 1983 and lasted until 2007, when he returned to his position as professor in the University of Extremadura.

The shortest-serving president of all time was Antonio Rodríguez Basulto of La Rioja, who served for 126 days between January 25 and May 30, 1983.

Age 

The youngest regional president to serve was Joan Lerma of the Valencian Community (born in 1951), who became President of the Valencian government in 1982, at the age of 31.

Gender 
As of March 2021, there are 15 male regional presidents and 4 female regional presidents: Francina Armengol of the Balearic Islands, Concha Andreu of La Rioja, Isabel Díaz Ayuso of the Community of Madrid and María Chivite of Navarre. Of those, Armengol, Andreu and Chivite belong to the social-democratic Spanish Socialist Workers' Party, while Díaz Ayuso is from the conservative People's Party.

Fifteen women have served or are currently serving as regional presidents, including one in an acting capacity. Asturias, the Basque Country, the Canary Islands, Cantabria, Castile and León, Catalonia, Ceuta, Extremadura, Galicia, Melilla and the Valencian Community have never had a female regional president.

The first female regional president was María Antonia Martínez García of the Region of Murcia, who was elected on May 3, 1993, succeeding Carlos Collado Mena.

The Region of Murcia is the only Autonomous community to have had female regional presidents from both major parties, although conservative María Dolores Pagán Arce served only in the acting capacity for a short time. Navarre was the first region where a woman followed another woman as regional president, with Uxue Barkos succeeding Yolanda Barcina (they were from different parties). Uxue Barkos was also succeeded by another woman, current President María Chivite. The Community of Madrid and Navarre have had the most female regional presidents with a total of three, and Navarre is also the first region to have three women in a row serve as president.

The total of five female regional presidents serving from June 25 to July 1, 2015  at the same time is the current record in Spain.

LGBT status 
There are currently no regional presidents who identify themselves as LGBT. However, former president of the Canary Islands Jerónimo Saavedra, recognized his homosexuality years after leaving the position. At the moment he is the only president or former regional president to have declared so.

Birthplace 
As no region has laws that establish the need to be born in the region in order to reach the presidency, 21 of the regional presidents were born outside the Autonomous community where they served:

  Andalusia: Manuel Chaves (Ceuta), José Antonio Griñán (Madrid) and Juan Manuel Moreno (Catalonia).
  Aragon: Hipólito Gómez de las Roces and Emilio Eiroa (Asturias) and Luisa Fernanda Rudi (Andalusia).
  Asturias: Juan Luis Rodríguez-Vigil (Castilla-La Mancha) and Francisco Álvarez-Cascos (Madrid).
  Balearic Islands: José Ramón Bauzá (Madrid).
  Canary Islands: Lorenzo Olarte (Galicia).
  Cantabria: José Joaquín Martínez (Basque Country).
  Castile and León: José María Aznar (Madrid).
  Castilla-La Mancha: María Dolores de Cospedal (Madrid).
  Catalonia: José Montilla (Andalusia).
  Community of Madrid: Joaquín Leguina (Cantabria).
  Region of Murcia: Pedro Antonio Sánchez (La Rioja).
  Navarre: Yolanda Barcina (Castile and León).
  Valencian Community: Eduardo Zaplana (Murcia) and Jose Luis Olivas (Castilla-La Mancha).

Juan Manuel Moreno (Andalusia) is the only current regional presidents born outside of the Autonomous community he governs.

Apart from those, Francesc Antich Oliver, from the Balearic Islands, was born in Caracas, Venezuela, although he holds Spanish nationality, and Carlos Collado Mena, from Murcia, was born in Orléans, France, from exiled Spaniards during the Spanish Civil War.

Religion
Although Spain is a still predominantly Catholic country, the latest studies show an increasing decline of religious beliefs in Spanish society, with the latest CIS study conducted in May 2021 indicating that compared to 58.2% of the Spanish population that declare themselves Catholic, 37.5% declare themselves either atheist, agnostic or non-believer. Currently, the presidents of Andalusia, Asturias, the Basque Country, Extremadura, Galicia and Murcia declare themselves as Catholics, while the presidents of Aragon, the Balearic Islands, Cantabria, Catalonia and the Community of Madrid declare themselves to be either atheist or non-believers.

Physical disability

Salary 
The highest salary currently being accepted is that of Catalan President Pere Aragonés at €153,235.5 The lowest salary is that of Asturian President Adrián Barbón at €69,128.62.

Seven autonomies (Aragon, Basque Country, Catalonia, La Rioja, Madrid, Castilla-La Mancha and the Balearic Islands) currently offer their presidents a higher salary than the €85,608.72 paid to the Prime Minister of Spain.

Regional election timeline 
Each tenure is set to last for four years. Presidents of Andalusia, the Basque Country, Catalonia and Galicia can trigger snap elections, that would then restart the count until the next one. In the rest of Autonomies, elections are fixed to a certain common date, which is currently "the fourth Sunday of May each four years". If snap elections are triggered in these regions (See 2021 Madrilenian regional elections), the mandate given to the next elected president would last until the calendar date in which elections would have been called again.

Term limits 
The Region of Murcia and Extremadura were the only Autonomous Communities that, since 2014, limit the number of terms of their Presidents. The Region of Murcia sets the limit at two, whether consecutive or not, while Extremadura stated that "not being able to be elected president of the Junta de Extremadura those who have already held this position for two successive terms, unless four years have passed since the end of their term and, in no case, whoever has held this position for at least eight years can be elected". However, in 2019, the article that limited the terms of the President of Extremadura was repealed. Two more regions, Catalonia and Castilla-La Mancha, have had their Statutes of Autonomy modified to allow their regional parliaments to stablish a term limit, although mandates have not been regulated. In 2021, the Assembly of Murcia eliminated the term limit that would have forbidden president López Miras from seeking a third term.

Relationship with vice-president
The existence of the figure of a vice-president varies by Autonomous community. In all communities it is a power of the elected President to appoint a vice-president to replace them if needed, but not all Presidents choose to have an official one, instead appointing a member of their cabinet as their possible replacement.

Four Autonomous communities have two vice-presidents: The Basque Country (Josu Erkoreka, PNV and Idoia Mendia, PSE), Galicia (Francisco Conde and Diego Calvo, PP), Navarre (Javier Remírez, PSOE and José Mari Aierdi, GBai) and the Valencian Community (Aitana Mas, Compromís and Héctor Illueca, Podemos).
Ten Autonomous communities have a vice-president: Those communities are Aragon (Arturo Aliaga, PAR), Asturias (Juan Cofiño, PSOE), Balearic Islands (Juan Pedro Yllanes, Podemos), Canary Islands (Román Rodríguez, Nueva Canarias), Cantabria (Pablo Zuloaga, PSC), Castilla-La Mancha (José Luis Martínez, PSOE), Castile and León (Juan García-Gallardo, Vox), Extremadura (Pilar Blanco-Morales, PSOE), Madrid (Enrique Ossorio, PP) and Murcia (Isabel Franco, Independent, formerly Citizens).
Three Autonomous communities do not have a vice-president: Andalusia, Catalonia and La Rioja.
The two Autonomous cities do not have a vice-president.

Constitutional qualifications by region

In national politics 
Many regional presidents have served, in addition to the regional level, at different levels of the national government, before or after their election as regional presidents.

  Andalusia:
 Manuel Chaves: Minister of Labour and National Health Service (1986-1990), Minister of Territorial Policy (2009-2010), Minister of Territorial Policy and Public Administration (2010-2011), Third Deputy Prime Minister of Spain (2009-2011), Second Deputy Prime Minister of Spain (2011).
 José Antonio Griñán: Minister of Health and Consumption (1992-1993), Minister of Labour and Social Policy (1993-1996).
  Aragon:
 Luisa Fernanda Rudí: President of the Congress of Deputies (2000-2004).
  Asturias:
 Francisco Álvarez-Cascos: Deputy Prime Minister of Spain (1996-2000).
  Balearic Islands:
 Jaume Matas: Minister of the Environment (2000-2003).
  Basque Country:
 Patxi López: President of the Congress of Deputies (2016).
  Canary Islands:
 Jerónimo Saavedra: Minister of Public Administration (1993-1995), Minister of Education and Science (1995-1996).
  Castile and León: 
 José María Aznar: Prime Minister of Spain (1996-2004).
 Jesús Posada: Minister of Agriculture, Fisheries and Food (1999-2000), Minister of Public Administrations (2000-2002), President of the Congress of Deputies (2011-2016).
 Juan José Lucas: Minister for the Presidency (2001-2002), President of the Senate (2002-2004).
  Castilla-La Mancha: 
 José Bono: Minister of Defence (2004-2006), President of the Congress of Deputies (2008-2011).
 María Dolores de Cospedal: Minister of Defence (2016-2018).
  Catalonia: 
 José Montilla: Minister of Industry, Trade and Tourism (2004-2006).
  Galicia: 
 Manuel Fraga: Minister of Information and Tourism (1962-1969), Minister of the Interior (1975-1976).
  Community of Madrid:
 Alberto Ruiz-Gallardón: Minister of Justice (2011-2014).
 Esperanza Aguirre: Minister of Education, Culture and Sport (1996-1999), President of the Senate (1999-2002).
 Cristina Cifuentes: Government Delegate in the Community of Madrid (2012-2015).
  Valencian Community: 
 Eduardo Zaplana: Minister of Labour and Social Affairs (2002-2004).

See also 

 List of current presidents of the autonomous communities of Spain
 Government of Spain
 Autonomous communities of Spain
List of female presidents of the autonomous communities of Spain

Footnotes

References

External links

Notes

Translation of terms

Politics of Spain
Autonomous communities of Spain